Zhao Jianfei (born 21 January 1999) is a Chinese footballer currently playing as a defender for Shandong Taishan in the Chinese Super League.

Club career
Zhao Jianfei would play for the Shandong Luneng (now renamed Shandong Taishan) youth team and the various age groups for the Chinese national team. At the start of the 2018 Chinese Super League he was officially promoted to the Shandong senior team. He would eventually go on to make his debut in a league game on 14 April 2019 against Dalian Yifang in 1-0 defeat. While on duty with the Chinese U23 team at the 2020 AFC U-23 Championship during a press conference Zhao claimed that his monthly contract was 20,000 Yuan at Shandong.

On 30 September 2020, he was loaned out to fellow top tier club Shijiazhuang Ever Bright for the remainder of the 2020 Chinese Super League season. On his return to Shandong he would be used as a squad player within the team and would gain his first league title with the club when he was part of the team that won the 2021 Chinese Super League title. This would be followed up by him winning the 2022 Chinese FA Cup with them the next season.

Career statistics

Honours

Club
Shandong Luneng/ Shandong Taishan
Chinese Super League: 2021
Chinese FA Cup: 2020, 2021, 2022.

References

External links

1999 births
Living people
Chinese footballers
Association football defenders
Chinese Super League players
Shandong Taishan F.C. players
Cangzhou Mighty Lions F.C. players